Sofia Osmani (born 20 March 1979, in Virum) is a Danish politician, who has served as mayor of Lyngby-Taarbæk Municipality since 2013, elected for Conservative People's Party. She was first elected into the municipal council in the 2001 local elections.

References

1979 births
Danish municipal councillors
People from Lyngby-Taarbæk Municipality
Mayors of places in Denmark
Women mayors of places in Denmark
Conservative People's Party (Denmark) politicians
Living people
Danish people of Indian descent